Agustin Gómez (born 28 August 1996) is an Argentine professional footballer who plays as a centre-back for Instituto.

Career
Gómez spent time in the ranks of Racing Club and Quilmes, prior to joining Defensa y Justicia. On 26 July 2017, Gómez joined Allsvenskan side AIK on loan until December 2017. He made his senior debut on 23 August 2017 during a Svenska Cupen victory away to Värmbols. He returned to Defensa y Justicia in 2018 after no league appearances for AIK, though he was an unused substitute eight times. On 30 June 2018, Fénix of Primera B Metropolitana signed Gómez. After debuting against Almirante Brown on 10 September, the centre-back made nineteen appearances for El Blanquinegro as they finished twelfth in 2018–19.

Gómez spent the 2019–20 campaign with fellow third tier team Defensores Unidos. His first appearance came in a 1–0 win away from home against Deportivo Armenio on 4 August 2019, as he replaced Mateo Escobar in stoppage time at Estadio Armenia. On 2 March 2021, Gómez was announced as a new signing by Primera Nacional outfit Instituto.

Career statistics
.

References

External links

1996 births
Living people
Place of birth missing (living people)
Argentine footballers
Association football defenders
Argentine expatriate footballers
Expatriate footballers in Sweden
Argentine expatriate sportspeople in Sweden
Primera B Metropolitana players
Defensa y Justicia footballers
AIK Fotboll players
Club Atlético Fénix players
Defensores Unidos footballers
Instituto footballers